Queen Noor Civil Aviation Technical College (QNAC or QNCATC) is a private engineering college located in Aqaba, Jordan. The college was established in 1973 with the support of the ICAO. In 1990, the college became one of the first members of the ICAO TRAINAIR Program.

References

External links 
 

Educational institutions established in 1973
Education in Jordan
1973 establishments in Jordan